Alan F. Hebditch (born 1961) is an English former professional footballer who played as a defender.

Career
Born in Wigan, Hebditch played for Leeds United, Bradford City and Bradley Rangers.

For Bradford City he made 2 appearances in the Football League.

Sources

References

1961 births
Living people
English footballers
Leeds United F.C. players
Bradford City A.F.C. players
English Football League players
Association football defenders